The Chase Lake Wilderness is located in the U.S. state of North Dakota and at , it covers the majority of the land area of Chase Lake National Wildlife Refuge. Managed by the U.S. Fish and Wildlife Service, the wilderness was designated by Congress in 1975.

Home to as many as 30,000 white pelicans, the wilderness preserves habitat for the largest single grouping of pelicans in North America. The pelicans have enjoyed a tremendous rebound from the 50 or so examples that existed in the region when first counted in 1908. Tending to nest on two large islands within the lake for protection from predators, some of the pelicans have been banded and these same birds have been found as far south as the Everglades in Florida during the winter months. Chase Lake is an alkaline lake and supports no fish species, so the pelicans rely on the plentiful tiger salamander as a food source. The white pelican is the largest of all pelicans; they can have a 10-foot (3 m) wingspan and weigh an average of 20 pounds.

Many other bird species can also be found here including herons, loons, ibises, ducks, geese, hawks and terns to name but a few. White-tailed deer, weasels, coyote and badger also inhabit the wilderness.

No camping is permitted in the wilderness and some areas are completely off limits to people, especially during the nesting season. A few trails allow access for bird watching and visitors are encouraged to remain on designated trails.

U.S. Wilderness Areas do not allow motorized or mechanized vehicles, including bicycles. Although camping and fishing are allowed with proper permit, no roads or buildings are constructed and there is also no logging or mining, in compliance with the 1964 Wilderness Act. Wilderness areas within National Forests and Bureau of Land Management areas also allow hunting in season.

References

External links
 
 
 

IUCN Category Ib
Protected areas of Stutsman County, North Dakota
Wilderness areas of North Dakota
Protected areas established in 1975